The Lienz Dolomites are an alpine mountain range located in the Austrian states of  East Tyrol and Carinthia. It lies at the western side of the wider Gailtal Alps and contains its highest peaks. The range lies between the Drau Valley in the north and the Gail Valley to the south.

Its most notable summits include the Große Sandspitze at 2,770 m, the
Spitzkofel (2,717 m), the Hochstadel (2,681 m) and the Eggenkofel (2591 m).

References

 
Mountain ranges of the Alps
Mountain ranges of Austria